Asadabad-e Olya may refer to:

Asadabad-e Olya, Selseleh, Lorestan Province
Asadabad-e Olya, Yazd